The following is a list of presidents of the Landtag für Württemberg-Hohenzollern.

President of the Beratende Landesversammlung des Landes Württemberg-Hohenzollern

President of the Landtag

Sources
Landtag von Baden-Württemberg (HrSg.): MdL, die Abgeordneten der Landtage in Baden-Württemberg 1946-1978, Stuttgart 1978 

Political history of Germany
Lists of legislative speakers in Germany